Robert Church may refer to:

 Robert Bertram Church, Canadian livestock geneticist
 Robert Reed Church (1839–1912), African-American entrepreneur, businessman and landowner from Tennessee
 Robert Church Jr.  (1885–1952), heir to his father's business interests and a political organizer
 Robert Church (lacrosse) (born 1991), Canadian lacrosse player on the Edmonton Rush and Saskatchewan Rush

See also
Bob Church (disambiguation)